Jonas Lorenzen Raun (born 22 August 1989 in Haderslev, Denmark) is an  international speedway racer, formerly with the Belle Vue Aces in the British Elite League.

In 2006, he also rode for Polish third division side Rawicz, and he rode in the Danish Under 21 final in 2005, at age 16, and finished 15th over all. In 2007, he rode 32 matches for Newcastle, achieving an average of 5.50, before crashing in September.

References

1989 births
Living people
People from Haderslev Municipality
Danish speedway riders
Sportspeople from the Region of Southern Denmark